Karyopherins are proteins involved in transporting molecules between the cytoplasm and the nucleus of a eukaryotic cell. The inside of the nucleus is called the karyoplasm (or nucleoplasm). Generally, karyopherin-mediated transport occurs through nuclear pores which act as a gateway into and out of the nucleus. Most proteins require karyopherins to traverse the nuclear pore.

Karyopherins can act as importins (i.e. helping proteins get into the nucleus) or exportins (i.e. helping proteins get out of the nucleus). They belong to the nuclear pore complex family in the transporter classification database (TCDB). Energy for transport is derived from the Ran gradient.

Upon stress, several karyopherins stop shuttling between the nucleus and the cytoplasm and are sequestered in stress granules, cytoplasmic aggregates of ribonucleoprotein complexes.

Importin beta

Importin beta is a variety of karyopherin that facilitates the transport of cargo proteins into the nucleus. First, it is binding importin alpha – another type of karyopherin that binds the cargo protein in the cytoplasm—before the cargo protein is imported into the nucleus through the nuclear pore using energy derived from the Ran gradient. Once inside the nucleus, the cargo dissociates from the karyopherins.

Importin beta can also carry proteins into the nucleus without the aid of the importin alpha adapter protein.

Human genes in the karyopherin family
 KPNA1
 KPNA2
 KPNA3
 KPNA4
 KPNA5
 KPNA6
 KPNB1
 CRM1

Additional images

References

External links
 
 Illustrations at berkeley.edu
 Karyopherin animations
 Karyopherin illustrations
 3D electron microscopy structures of exportin from the EM Data Bank(EMDB)

Transport proteins